The following elections occurred in the year 1830.

 1830 French legislative election
 1830–1831 papal conclave

North America

United States
 1830 Illinois gubernatorial election
 1830 New York gubernatorial election
 1830 United States House of Representatives elections
 1830 and 1831 United States Senate elections

Europe

United Kingdom
 1830 United Kingdom general election

See also
 :Category:1830 elections

1830
Elections